Luding may refer to:

Luding County, in Sichuan, China
Luding Bridge, in Luding County, China
Christa Luding-Rothenburger, German speed skater and track cyclist
Typhoon Dinah (1987), known as Typhoon Luding in the Philippines